Artemis 2 (officially Artemis II) is the second scheduled mission of NASA's Artemis program, and the first scheduled crewed mission of NASA's Orion spacecraft, currently planned to be launched by the Space Launch System (SLS) in November 2024. The crewed Orion spacecraft will perform a lunar flyby test and return to Earth. Artemis 2 is planned to be the first crewed spacecraft to travel to the Moon, or beyond low Earth orbit, since Apollo 17 in 1972. 

Originally designated Exploration Mission-2 (EM-2), the mission was intended to collect samples from a captured asteroid in lunar orbit by the now canceled robotic Asteroid Redirect Mission; it was renamed after the introduction of the Artemis program. The mission is also planned to be the first crewed launch from LC-39B since STS-116.

Overview 

The Artemis 2 mission plan objective is to send four astronauts in the first crewed Orion MPCV Spacecraft into a lunar flyby for a maximum of 21 days using the Block 1 variant of the Space Launch System.  The mission profile is a multi-trans lunar injection (MTLI), or multiple departure burns, and includes a free return trajectory from the Moon. The Orion spacecraft will be sent to a high Earth orbit with a period of roughly 42 hours. During this time the crew will perform various checkouts of the spacecraft's life support systems as well as an in-space rendezvous and proximity operations demonstration using the spent Interim Cryogenic Propulsion Stage (ICPS) as a target. When Orion reaches perigee once again, it will fire its main engine to complete the TLI maneuver which will send it to a lunar free return trajectory, before returning to Earth.

History 

The plan was to rendezvous with an asteroid previously placed in lunar orbit by the robotic Asteroid Redirect Mission and have astronauts perform space-walks and gather samples. After the cancellation in April 2017 of the Asteroid Redirect Mission, an eight-day mission was proposed with a crew of four astronauts, sent on a free return trajectory around the Moon. Another proposal suggested in 2017 was to take four astronauts aboard Orion on an 8-to-21-day trip around the Moon to deliver the first element of the Deep Space Gateway. In March 2018, it was decided to launch the first Gateway module on a commercial launch vehicle because of delays in building the Mobile Launcher needed to hold the more powerful Exploration Upper Stage. The launcher was selected to be the Falcon Heavy.

As of 30 November 2022, the Space Launch System Core Stage assigned to the Artemis II mission is supposed to complete engine installation by the end of 2022 and have been delivered to Kennedy Space Center in Spring 2023. However, as of 4 January 2023, no word of engine installation has yet to be released by NASA.

On 11 February 2023, NASA flipped the engine section for the Artemis II Core Stage to horizontal, the final major milestone before mating the section to the rest of the vehicle. As of 15 February, the Core Stage is expected to be complete in May 2023.

Crew 
While personnel have not yet been announced for the mission, the four-person crew of Artemis 2 will include a Canadian Space Agency (CSA) astronaut, the first Canadian and non-American to travel beyond low Earth orbit, under the terms of a 2020 treaty between the United States and Canada. Later missions will have international crews including European and Asian astronauts.

NASA Administrator Bill Nelson, in his "State of NASA" speech reacting to President Joe Biden's FY2024 budget proposal, announced that the crew will be revealed on April 3, 2023.

Secondary payloads 

NASA's CubeSat Launch Initiative (CSLI) sought proposals in 2019 from U.S. institutions and U.S. companies to fly their CubeSat missions as secondary payloads aboard the SLS on the Artemis II mission. NASA would accept proposals for both six-unit and 12-unit CubeSats. As with the Artemis I mission, the CubeSats flying on Artemis II were to be mounted on the inside of the stage adapter ring between the SLS upper stage and the Orion spacecraft, and will be deployed after Orion separates. Selections were initially planned to be made by February 2020, but the date passed with no official announcement. In October 2021, NASA dropped all secondary payloads from the mission.

Optical communications 
Artemis II will test and demonstrate optical communications to and from Earth using the Orion Artemis II Optical Communications System (O2O). The O2O hardware will be integrated into the Orion spacecraft  and includes an optical module (a 4-inch telescope and two gimbals), modem and control electronics. O2O will communicate with ground stations in California and New Mexico. Test will send data to Earth with a downlink rate of up to 260 megabits per second.

Launch date 
During preliminary reviews in 2011, the launch date was placed somewhere between 2019 and 2021, but afterwards the launch date was delayed to 2023 on a Space Launch System (SLS) launch vehicle. Although, as of March 2023, the mission is pegged for a November 2024 launch, the need to recycle and refurbish components from Orion that flew on Artemis 1 may push this back to later in 2024 or the first quarter of 2025.

Similar missions

Flown 
In 1968, the Apollo 8 mission, crewed by astronauts Frank Borman, Jim Lovell, and William Anders, was designed to test-fly command and service module beyond low Earth orbit. Although similar to Artemis 2 in that it was crewed and did not land on the Moon, it differed by completing 10 orbits of the Moon. Apollo 13 (1970) was the only Apollo mission that flew past the Moon by a free-return trajectory.

Proposed 
In 2005, the company Space Adventures announced plans to take two tourists within  of the lunar surface using a Soyuz spacecraft piloted by a professional cosmonaut. The mission, named DSE-Alpha, has been priced at US$150 million per seat and is expected to last 8–9 days when scheduled. Company CEO Eric Anderson stated in 2011 that one seat had been sold, but the launch date has continually slipped since the second seat remains unsold .

A SpaceX lunar tourism mission was initially proposed for late 2018 and would have been similar to Artemis 2 in crew size, with two space tourists paying for a free-return loop around the Moon and back to Earth, using the Crew Dragon capsule and launched on the Falcon Heavy. After the first flight of Falcon Heavy in 2018, SpaceX announced that Falcon Heavy would not be used for crewed flights to focus their future development on Starship and indicated that the lunar mission would more likely be carried out with the Starship. On 14 September 2018, SpaceX officially announced that it had signed one of the paying passengers, Yusaku Maezawa, for the #dearMoon project mission using Starship and that he would invite 6 to 8 artists to join him.

References 

Missions to the Moon
Artemis program
Crewed missions to the Moon
Orion (spacecraft)
Space Launch System
Crewed spacecraft
2024 in spaceflight
2024 in the United States
Future human spaceflights